Martha Kay Renfroe was an American writer of mystery and science fiction. Renfroe, who published her works under the pseudonym M.K. Wren, was best known for her mystery series featuring the character Conan Flagg.

Early life 
Renfroe was born in Texas.

Career 
Using the nom de plume M. K. Wren, her works included the Conan Flagg Mystery series, the Phoenix Legacy, a space opera trilogy, and A Gift Upon the Shore (1990), a post-apocalyptic novel. Publishers Weekly in its review of A Gift Upon the Shore described Wren's descriptions of "the subsistence-level daily life – the triumphs, the losses and the desperation" – as "compelling depictions." A Los Angeles Times review called Wren’s writing of the same book as "clear and concise for the most part, though bordering on the mystic when it comes to her descriptions of the woods, and especially the ocean in its many moods." The New York Times included it in its overview of recently released crime/suspense novels in its "Criminal At Large" column, describing Wren's A Multitude of Sins as "an artificial and pretentious formula mystery about an heiress who is a pianistic genius."

The Conan Flagg mysteries were translated into German and released by München Goldmann publisher in the late 1970s in Germany.

Personal life 
Renfroe was a longtime resident of Lincoln City, Oregon. She was also an artist whose artwork showed in galleries and at juried and invitational shows.

Bibliography

A Conan Flagg Mystery (1973–1994)

Phoenix Legacy (1981)

References

External links
 

20th-century American novelists
American mystery writers
American science fiction writers
American women novelists
Pseudonymous women writers
Novelists from Oregon
Novelists from Texas
1938 births
2016 deaths
Women science fiction and fantasy writers
Women mystery writers
20th-century American women writers
20th-century pseudonymous writers
21st-century American women